Gisela Dulko and Ashley Harkleroad were the defending champions, but they did not compete in the Juniors this year.

Elke Clijsters and Barbora Strýcová defeated Ally Baker and Anna-Lena Grönefeld in the final, 6–4, 5–7, 8–6 to win the girls' doubles tennis title at the 2002 Wimbledon Championships.

Seeds

  Elke Clijsters /  Barbora Strýcová (champions)
  Ally Baker /  Anna-Lena Grönefeld (final)
  Silvana Bauer /  Elise Tamaëla (quarterfinals)
  Eva Birnerová /  Petra Cetkovská (first round)
  Jarmila Gajdošová /  Andrea Hlaváčková (semifinals)
  Anna Bastrikova /  Vera Dushevina (quarterfinals)
  Salome Devidze /  Evgenia Linetskaya (withdrew)
  Megan Falcon /  Hsieh Su-wei (quarterfinals)

Draw

Finals

Top half

Bottom half

References

External links

Girls' Doubles
Wimbledon Championship by year – Girls' doubles